The Arboretum du Chêne-Vert (3 hectares) is a private arboretum located just off the Route de Limoges in Chabanais, Charente, Nouvelle-Aquitaine, France. It is open daily by appointment; an admission fee is charged.

The arboretum was established in 1977 beside the Vienne River, with most landscaping and development taking place since 1985. It currently contains more than 2500 species of trees, shrubs and perennials, including birches (40 varieties), pines (60), magnolias (40), maples (102), oaks (60), as well as hybrid roses (75 varieties), lonicera (60), and cornus (40). Plantings also include good collections of Hamamelidaceae, Styracaceae, and Stewartia, as well as herbs, ferns, bulbs, and flowers.

See also 
 List of botanical gardens in France

References 
 Arboretum du Chêne-Vert
 Arboretum du Chêne-Vert
 CCV, le Collectif du Chêne Vert
 Visit Charente description
 Charente Limousine description (French)

Gardens in Charente
Chene Vert